This is a list of bishops, prince-bishops, and administrators of Verden. The Catholic Diocese of Verden, was a suffragan of the Archdiocese of Mainz. From the 12th century, the Bishop of Verden was also, ex officio, a prince of the Holy Roman Empire and the ruler of a state in imperial immediacy — the Prince-Bishopric of Verden (. The Prince-Bishopric was established in 1180 and disestablished in 1648. The city of Verden upon Aller was the seat of the cathedral and  the cathedral chapter. The bishop also resided there until 1195 when the residenz was moved to Rotenburg upon Wümme.

Titles of the incumbents of the Verden See 
Not all incumbents of the Verden See were imperially invested princely power as Prince-Bishops and not all were papally confirmed as bishops. In 1180 part of the Verden diocesan territory were disentangled from the Duchy of Saxony and became an own territory of imperial immediacy called Prince-Bishopric of Verden, a vassal of the Holy Roman Empire. The prince-bishopric was an elective monarchy, with the monarch being the respective bishop usually elected by the Verden cathedral chapter, and confirmed by the Holy See, or exceptionally only appointed by the Holy See. Papally confirmed bishops were then invested by the emperor with the princely regalia, thus the title prince-bishop. However, sometimes the respective incumbent of the see never gained a papal confirmation, but was still invested the princely regalia. Also the opposite occurred with a papally confirmed bishop, never invested as prince. A number of incumbents, elected by the chapter, neither achieved papal confirmation nor imperial investiture, but as a matter of fact nevertheless de facto held the princely power. The respective incumbents of the see bore the following titles:
 Bishop of Verden until 1180
 Prince-Bishop of Verden from 1180 to 1566 and again 1630 to 1631
 Administrator of the Prince-Bishopric of Verden 1566 to 1630 and again 1631 to 1645. Either simply de facto replacing the Prince-Bishop or lacking canon-law prerequisites the incumbent of the see would officially only hold the title administrator (but nevertheless colloquially referred to as Prince-Bishop). From 1566 to 1630 and again 1631 to 1645 all administrators were Lutherans.

Catholic Bishops of Verden till 1180

Catholic Prince-Bishops (1180–1566)

Lutheran Administrators of the Prince-Bishopric (1566–1630)

Catholic Prince-Bishop (1630–1631)

Lutheran Administrators of the Prince-Bishopric (1631–1645)

Sources 
 Arend Mindermann, Urkundenbuch der Bischöfe und des Domkapitels von Verden: 2 vols. (vol. 1: 'Von den Anfängen bis 1300' ; vol. 2: '1300 – 1380' ), Stade: Landschaftsverband der ehem. Herzogtümer Bremen und Verden, Stade, 2001 and 2004.
 Thomas Vogtherr (ed.), Chronicon episcoporum Verdensium = Die Chronik der Verdener Bischöfe, commented and translated, Stade: 1997,

Notes 

Verden, Prince-Bishopric of
Verden, Prince-Bishopric of
Prince-Bishopric of Verden